The Lang Stane of Auquhollie is an Ogam-inscribed standing stone some 6 kilometres north-west of Stonehaven in Scotland. Situated on south side of Meikle Carew Hill at a height of about 140 metres above sea level, the stone is approximately 3 metres in height and 0.75 metres in diameter, an unshaped monolith of gneiss.

References and further reading
 Allen & Anderson
 
 CISP
 
 Forsyth, unpub dissert
 
 Other PSAS, Henderson, xci:60
 Jürgen Uhlich. "Dov(a)- and Lenited -B- in Ogam", in Ériu 40 (1989): 129–34.
 Eoin MacNeill. "Archaisms in the Ogham Inscriptions", in Proceedings of the Royal Irish Academy, Section C, Vol. 39 (1929–1931): 33–53.

External links
 
 

Pictish stones
Pictish stones in Aberdeenshire
Ogham
Culture of medieval Scotland
Scheduled monuments in Scotland